Jacob Axel Per Ondrejka (born 2 September 2002) is a Swedish professional footballer who plays as a forward for Allsvenskan club IF Elfsborg.

Career 
Ondrejka made his full international debut for Sweden on 12 January 2023, scoring the winning goal in a friendly 2–1 win against Iceland.

Career statistics

Club

Notes

International 

 Scores and results list Sweden's goal tally first, score column indicates score after each Ondrejka goal.

References

2002 births
Living people
Swedish footballers
Association football forwards
Ettan Fotboll players
Allsvenskan players
Landskrona BoIS players
IF Elfsborg players
Swedish people of Czech descent